Bibipur is a village and Gram panchayat in Bilhaur Tehsil, Kanpur Nagar district, Uttar Pradesh, India. It is located 60 km away from Kanpur City. Village Code is 149964.

References

Villages in Kanpur Nagar district